Tutcheria virgata (syn. Pyrenaria microcarpa) is an evergreen plant in the genus Tutcheria of the family Theaceae.

Description
Fuits are ovoid or globose capsules about long, with three chestnut brown seeds per locule. Flowering period extends from April through July, while the fruits ripe from August up to November.

Distribution and habitat
This plant is native to China and it is also present in Japan (Ryukyu Islands) and in Vietnam.

References

 Zipcodezoo
 
 Flora of China

Theaceae